Amanda Schott (born 24 September 1996) is a Brazilian weightlifter. She won the bronze medal in the women's 87kg Snatch event at the 2021 World Weightlifting Championships held in Tashkent, Uzbekistan. She won the bronze medal in the women's 81kg event at the 2021 Pan American Weightlifting Championships held in Guayaquil, Ecuador.

She competed at the 2022 Pan American Weightlifting Championships held in Bogotá, Colombia. A few months later, she won the bronze medal in the women's 76kg event at the 2022 South American Games held in Asunción, Paraguay.

Achievements

References

External links 
 

Living people
1996 births
Place of birth missing (living people)
Brazilian female weightlifters
Pan American Weightlifting Championships medalists
South American Games bronze medalists for Brazil
South American Games medalists in weightlifting
Competitors at the 2022 South American Games
21st-century Brazilian women